Bruce M. "Bear" Fischer (March 20, 1936 - April 11, 2018) was an American actor, best known for playing the prisoner and rapist Wolf Grace, in the 1979 film, Escape from Alcatraz. Fischer also played a rapist in Clint Eastwood's The Outlaw Josey Wales (1976), and Mr. Cooger in the film Something Wicked This Way Comes (1983). His other film credits include The Journey of Natty Gann (1985) and Grim Prairie Tales (1990) as an undead gunman. In addition Fischer was one of the Beauregard Brothers on TV's Dukes of Hazzard.

Filmography

Film

Television

References

External links

1936 births
2018 deaths
American male film actors
Male actors from North Carolina
People from Greensboro, North Carolina